Madhuca markleeana is a tree in the family Sapotaceae.

Description
The bark is chocolate brown. Inflorescences bear up to five white flowers.

Distribution and habitat
Madhuca markleeana is endemic to Borneo, where it is confined to Sarawak. Its habitat is lowland mixed dipterocarp forest to  altitude.

Conservation
Madhuca markleeana has been assessed as critically endangered on the IUCN Red List. The species is known from only two collections in Sarawak's Simunjan District, where most forest has been logged and converted to palm oil plantations.

References

markleeana
Endemic flora of Borneo
Trees of Borneo
Flora of Sarawak
Plants described in 2001